Minister of Municipal Affairs Tawfiq Kreishan (Arabic : توفيق كريشان ) (born 1947) is a Jordanian politician serving as Deputy Prime Minister and Minister of Municipal Affairs in Bisher Al-Khasawneh's Cabinet since 12 October 2020.

He graduated in accounting and business administration from Beirut Arab University. He was a member of the Senate, and was minister of Parliamentary affairs twice. He was also minister of Municipal Affairs five times. The first time he became a minister was in 1996. Before that he became a member of Parliament five times; twice in the Lower house, and three times in the Senate.

In office
Kreishan was part of the Jordanian government for many different terms.

Political experience

1993-1997 Member of Parliament
1994-1995 Minister of Municipal Affairs
1997-1998 Minister of Municipal Affairs
1998-1999 Minister Of Municipal Affairs
1998-2000 Member of The 
Senate
1999-2000 Minister of Municipal and Parliamentary Affairs
2003 minister of Parliamentary Affairs
2005 minister of Municipal Affaird
2007-2009 Member of the Chamber of Deputies
2009-2010 Minister of Parliamentary Affairs
2010 minister of parliamentary Affairs
2010 Member of the Senate
2011 Deputy Prime Minister

Decorations and honours
 Grand Cordon of the Order of the Star of Jordan

References

 http://www.kingabdullah.jo/main.php?main_page=3&lang_hmka1=1

External links
 Prime Ministry of Jordan website

1947 births
Living people
Members of the House of Representatives (Jordan)
Members of the Senate of Jordan
Municipal affairs ministers of Jordan
Parliamentary affairs ministers of Jordan
Government ministers of Jordan
Environment ministers of Jordan
Deputy prime ministers of Jordan
Academic staff of the University of Jordan
Academic staff of Al al-Bayt University
Beirut Arab University alumni